Gerald H. Hines (1903 – April 28, 1963) was an American football and basketball player, coach and athletic director at New Mexico College of Agriculture and Mechanic Arts (New Mexico A&M), now known as New Mexico State University.  Hines led the Aggies to multiple successful football and basketball seasons during the 1930s.

Hines was born in Mesilla, New Mexico in 1903 with twin brother, Harold, to Dr. Lemuel Hines and his wife, Minnie Hankins.  Hines attended Las Cruces Union High School from 1918 to 1922 and New Mexico A&M from 1922 to 1926. Hines was a captain of the Aggie basketball team and a quarterback for the Aggie football team.

Hines became head basketball and football coach at New Mexico A&M in 1929, and athletics director in 1930. Both teams excelled under Hines. Between 1934 and 1938, football was 31–10–6, and from 1935 to 1940, the basketball team went 102–36. The football team was invited to the first Sun Bowl in 1936 where they tied the Hardin–Simmons Cowboys, 14–14.

World War II brought an early end to Hines’ coaching career. As a battery commander of the 120th Combat Engineers, a New Mexico National Guard unit assigned to the 45th Infantry Division, Hines was among the first called to military duty in September 1940. He served honorably in Africa, Sicily, and Italy.

Hines ended his coaching career at NMSU with records of 54–36–10 in football, and 157–109 in basketball. He died in Albuquerque, New Mexico in 1963 at age 59.

Hines entered the NMSU Athletics Hall of Fame in 1970 was inducted into the Aggie Basketball Ring of Honor in 2009.

Head coaching record

Football

Basketball

References

1903 births
1963 deaths
American football quarterbacks
Guards (basketball)
New Mexico State Aggies athletic directors
New Mexico State Aggies football coaches
New Mexico State Aggies football players
New Mexico State Aggies men's basketball players
New Mexico State Aggies men's basketball coaches
High school basketball coaches in New Mexico
High school football coaches in New Mexico
United States Army personnel of World War II
United States Army officers
People from Doña Ana County, New Mexico
Players of American football from New Mexico
American twins
Twin sportspeople
American men's basketball players
Basketball coaches from New Mexico
Basketball players from New Mexico